"Panorama" is the ninth single from Japanese voice actress and singer Nana Mizuki.

The single was ranked No. 14 on the Japanese Oricon charts.

Track listing

Lyrics: Nana Mizuki
Composition: Akimitsu Honma
Arrangement: Akimitsu Honma, Tsutomu Ohira
cherish
Lyrics, composition, arrangement: Toshiro Yabuki
Heartbeat
Lyrics: Nana Mizuki
Composition: Takahiro Iida
Arrangement: Takahiro Iida, Tsutomu Ohira
Panorama -Panorama- (Off Vocal Version)
cherish (Off Vocal Version)
Heartbeat (Off Vocal Version)

Charts

Nana Mizuki songs
2004 singles
Songs written by Nana Mizuki
2004 songs
King Records (Japan) singles